Grave Encounters 2 is a 2012 Canadian supernatural horror film directed by John Poliquin and written by The Vicious Brothers. The sequel to Grave Encounters, the film follows a group of devoted fans of Grave Encounters who break into the same psychiatric hospital where the film took place to investigate whether the events in the film were real. The group then find themselves in the same plight as the Grave Encounters crew were in, becoming haunted and terrorized by the hospital's malevolent entities.

The film was released on iTunes on October 2, 2012 and received a limited theatrical release on October 12, 2012. Grave Encounters 2 became a commercial success, but unlike its predecessor, it was a critical failure.

Plot
Film student Alex Wright and his friends Jennifer Parker, Trevor Thompson, Tessa Hamill, and Jared Lee decide to produce a documentary about the original Grave Encounters film, which the entire public aside from Alex believes to be fictional. Alex posts an online plea for any information about the film and receives a message from someone named "DeathAwaits6". The message leads him to the mother of Sean Rogerson, the actor who played Lance in Grave Encounters. She believes that Sean is still alive but they discover that she has dementia and does not realize that her son is dead.

Alex realizes the cast and crew from the first film are all missing or have died (except for the directors, The Vicious Brothers, who we learn are actually interns of the first film's producer, Jerry, and were not directly involved, thus sparing their lives). Alex meets Hartfield, who confesses that the film was actual found footage. Discovering that the Collingwood Mental Hospital from the film is actually an abandoned asylum in British Columbia, Canada, Alex and his friends travel there to meet DeathAwaits6, where they discover an Ouija board. Using it to communicate with spirits, they realize that their online contact is not a person, but a paranormal entity, which turns violent.
The group make their way out before being stopped by the security guard. As the group and the security guard argue, they hear a noise. The security guard tells them to stay put. As the security guard goes to check out the noise, the group hears gun shots. They go to check what has happened and find that the security guard has disappeared.

The group tries to escape, resulting in the deaths of Jared (who is violently hurled out of the window) and Tessa (her head crushed by an invisible force). The survivors manage to escape the hospital and return to the hotel. To their dismay, the hotel's elevator leads them right back to the tunnels beneath the hospital. There, they meet Rogerson and discover that he has been trapped inside for over nine years, lobotomized and driven insane. Rogerson explains that the reason the hospital is like this is due to Dr. Arthur Friedkin's satanic experiments and rituals which merged the spirit world and the physical world. He shows them a red door and says it is the only way out, but it is wrapped in chains. The surviving members retrieve a chain cutter left in Trevor's tool bag.

While the group sleeps for the night, Rogerson, compelled by Dr. Friedkin, kills Trevor, then steals the team's equipment to cut the chains on the door. He goes through it, only to realize that the door leads nowhere. The entities instruct a deranged Rogerson to continue killing. Alex and Jennifer wake up and stumble upon Friedkin's satanic altar as he performs a lobotomy, then sacrifices an infant. The couple flees and encounters Rogerson, who demands them to hand over their tapes in order to "finish" the film, which is the only way to escape the hospital. During the struggle, a void opens up on the wall and sucks Rogerson in.

Realizing that Rogerson was being honest in how to escape, Alex kills Jennifer, thus completing the film. He then exits the hospital through the red door, which leads him to the outskirts of Los Angeles. He is arrested while walking down the street at night. The last scene shows that the footage has been made into a film, with Alex and producer Jerry claiming that everything the public sees has been staged and it is "just a movie". However, Alex tells the interviewers not to go anywhere near the hospital as it's not worth it.

The film ends, cutting to a black screen with the numbers "49, 14, 122, 48" appearing on screen, which, if searched on a service such as Google Maps, comes up as the approximate latitude and longitude coordinates of Riverview Hospital, near Vancouver, BC, Canada (actually at 49.25,-122.81) where most of the film's story takes place.

Cast
Richard Harmon as Alex Wright, a university student and filmmaker who becomes obsessed with the previous film.
Leanne Lapp as Jennifer Parker, a fellow student who is in love with Alex.
Sean Rogerson as himself/Lance Preston, who survived the events of Grave Encounters, but has gone insane after being trapped in the hospital for nine years.
Dylan Playfair as Trevor Thompson, Alex's best friend and cameraman.
Stephanie Bennett as Tessa Hamill, Jennifer's friend.
Howard Lai as Jared Lee, Alex's second cameraman and Tessa's boyfriend.
Sean Tyson as the guard stationed at the hospital.
Ben Wilkinson as Jerry Hartfield, the producer of Grave Encounters.
Arthur Corber as Dr. Arthur Friedkin, a doctor at Collingwood Psychiatric Hospital.
Brenda McDonald as Mrs. Rogerson.
Collin Minihan and Stuart Ortiz as the Vicious Brothers, the directors of Grave Encounters.
Dalila Bela as Kaitlin, a former patient at Collingwood.
Christopher Paul Hill as Vlogger
Roy Campsall as the emaciated demon.
Melissa Valvok and Brenda Anderson as nurse demons.
Dale Hall (IV) as an operated patient.
Maddox Valvok as an infant.
Merwin Mondesir (uncredited cameo) as himself/T.C. Gibson, the cameraman for Grave Encounters.
Mackenzie Gray (uncredited cameo) as himself/Houston Grey, the psychic for Grave Encounters.
Juan Riedinger (uncredited cameo) as himself/Matt White, the technical expert for Grave Encounters.
Ashleigh Gryzcko (uncredited cameo) as herself/Sasha Parker, an occult specialist for Grave Encounters.
Reese Alexander and Meeshelle Neal as Los Angeles police officers.

Production
Grave Encounters 2 began production in late 2011 and was released on October 12, 2012. Early in production it was revealed that the film would be directed by John Poliquin, and only written by the Vicious Brothers. The film's budget was $1,400,000. It was released on October 12, 2012 in a limited theatrical run, but released earlier in the month on iTunes for download.

Critical response
Grave Encounters 2 received negative reviews from critics. Rotten Tomatoes gave the film a score of 20% based on 10 reviews, with an average rating of 4.46 out of 10. Although it was panned, some critics praised the acting, especially Sean Rogerson's performance.

References

External links
 
 
Grave Encounters 2 (2012) at The Numbers

2012 films
2012 horror films
2010s psychological horror films
Canadian supernatural horror films
Canadian sequel films
English-language Canadian films
Films about filmmaking
Films directed by John Poliquin
Films set in abandoned houses
Films set in psychiatric hospitals
Films set in Los Angeles
Films set in Vancouver
Films shot in Vancouver
Found footage films
Films about Satanism
2010s supernatural horror films
Teleportation in films
2012 directorial debut films
2010s English-language films
2010s Canadian films